The 2022–23 season is Ross County's fourth consecutive season in the Scottish Premiership and the club's 10th season overall in the top flight of Scottish football. Ross County will also compete in the Scottish Cup entering in the fourth round and Scottish League Cup entering in the group stage.

Pre-season and friendlies

Scottish Premiership

Scottish Premiership

League table

Scottish Cup

League Cup

League table

Group stage

Knockout phase

Squad statistics

Captains

Appearances
As of 18 March 2023

|-
|colspan="10"|Players who left the club during the season
|-

|}

Goalscorers

Transfers

In

Out

Notes and references

2022-23
Ross County